How The First Helandman of God Was Maid is an anonymous comic poem in Scots preserved in the Bannatyne Manuscript of the sixteenth century.

The poem narrates how, following a wager proposed to him by Saint Peter, God creates the first Highlander from a piece of horse manure. The prototype highlander is depicted as a petty thief and a stealer of Lowlanders' cattle.

In the Bannatyne Manuscript the poem's full title is given as How the first Helandman of God was maid, Of ane Horss Turd, in Argylle, as is said. The piece is attributed to no author.

Synopsis

The Wager
The poem opens with God and Saint Peter walking "High up in Argyll, where their path lay." Peter asks The Lord "Can you not make a Highlandman out of this horse turd?"

The Highlander is Created
With a touch of his staff, God creates a Highlander from the piece of dung and asks him "Where do you want to go?"

The highlander replies that he will go to the lowlands to steal livestock.

When God points out to the highlander that he will be hanged for this crime the man claims to be indifferent. "I must die only once" he says.

God is amused by this and then departs by leaping over a wall. While doing so his knife falls from its sheath.

The Missing Knife
Peter searches thoroughly but unsuccessfully for the lost knife.

God observes "Here's a marvel! How can it be that my knife is missing when there are only three of us here?"

The highlander does not reply but, while turning to leave, the lost knife falls from a fold of his plaid.

Saint Peter reprimands him. "You will never do well. You, new-made, so soon turning to theft."

The highlander is unrepentant. The poem ends with him swearing an oath upon a nearby church. "As long as I may find goods to steal, I will never work!"

References

Poetry of the Bannatyne Manuscript
Scottish poems
Scots-language works
Middle Scots poems